Sonata is a Lithuanian feminine given name. People bearing the name Sonata include:
Sonata Milušauskaitė (born 1973), Lithuanian race walker
Sonata Tamošaitytė (born 1987), Lithuanian track and field athlete
Sonata Vanagaitė (born 1994), Lithuanian footballer

References

Lithuanian feminine given names